= Beaver Pond Formation =

Geological formation in Canada

- Stratigraphic range: Neoproterozoic
- Type: Formation
- Unit of: Burin Group

Lithology
- Primary: Mafic volcaniclastic deposits

Location
- Region: Newfoundland
- Country: Canada
- Occurrence of the Beaver Pond Formation in southeastern Newfoundland

The Beaver Pond Formation is a formation cropping out in Newfoundland, Canada.
